Vizha is a 2013 Tamil film directed by Barathi Balakumaran. It stars Mahendran and Malavika Menon. The film, based on the award-winning short film Uthiri, portrays the love story of Sundaram (Mahendran), who plays the thappu instrument at death functions, and Rakkamma (Malavika), an oppari singer. Extensively shot in Madurai and several scenes were shots on Ayyanputhur (A small village near Ordnance Estate, Trichy), Tiruchirappalli district, it has music composed by James Vasanthan, while U. K. Senthilkumar worked as the cinematographer and Praveen K. L.-N. B. Srikanth edited the film. Vizha was produced by Rama Narayanan and Sunir Kheterpal for Sri Thenandal Films, Azure Entertainment and JV Media Dreams. It released on 27 December 2013.

Cast
 Mahendran as Sundaram
 Malavika Menon as Rakkamma
 Yugendran as Manimaaran
 Kalloori Vinoth as Pusa
 Kaali Venkat as Paandi
 Dhandapani
 Kollangudi Karuppayi
 Theni Murugan
 Pillaiyarpati Jayalakshmi
 Smile Selva

Soundtrack
The soundtrack was composed by James Vasanthan.

"Madura Ennum" - Anthakudu ilaiyaraja, Dakshayini
"Sethu Po" - Gaana Bala, Theodore, Sunandhan
"Ennacho Edacho" - Lathakrishna
"Ennatha Solla" - Lathakrishna, D. Sathyaprakash
"Sollama Kollama" - Raghuram, Lathakrishna
"Nenjadichu Ninnene" - Lathakrishna

References

External links
 

2013 films
Features based on short films
Films shot in Madurai
2010s Tamil-language films
2013 directorial debut films
Films scored by James Vasanthan